The Czech Republic national under-21 football team is the national under-21 association football team of the Czech Republic and is controlled by the Football Association of the Czech Republic. The team competes in the UEFA European Under-21 Championship, held every two years.

Although the breakup of Czechoslovakia occurred officially on 1 January 1993, the under-21 team continued until the end of the 1994 championship.  After that, the Czech Republic and the Slovakia under-21s became separate footballing entities.

For both nations, the first matches were played in September 1994 in qualification for the 1996 championship.

The Czech Republic under-21 team reached the quarter-finals in 1996, but failed to qualify for 1998.  The team reached the final in both the 2000 and 2002 tournaments, winning the latter on penalties.

Subsequently, the team failed to qualify for the tournaments in 2004 and 2006. They qualified for the 2007 competition but finished last in the group stage. They once again failed to qualify for the 2009 competition. In the 2011 UEFA European Under-21 Championship, they placed fourth.

Competitive Record

Summer Olympics record

UEFA European Under-21 Championship Record

*Draws include knockout matches decided by penalty shootout.

Individual awards
In addition to team victories, Czech players have won individual awards at the UEFA European Under-21 Football Championship.

UEFA European Under-21 Championship

2023 UEFA European Under-21 Championship qualification

2023 UEFA European Under-21 Championship play-offs 

The four play-off winners qualify for the final tournament.

All times are CEST (UTC+2), as listed by UEFA (local times, if different, are in parentheses).

|}

2023 UEFA European Under-21 Championship (Final tournament) group stage

Results and fixtures

2021

2022

2023

Players

Current squad
 The following players were called up for the friendly matches.
 Match dates: 18 and 22 November 2022
 Opposition:  and 
 Caps and goals correct as of: 27 September 2022, after the match against .

Recent call-ups
The following players have previously been called up to the England under-21 squad in the last 12 months and remain eligible for selection.

Previous squads
2021 UEFA European Under-21 Football Championship squads – Czech Republic
2017 UEFA European Under-21 Football Championship squads – Czech Republic
2015 UEFA European Under-21 Football Championship squads – Czech Republic
2011 UEFA European Under-21 Football Championship squads – Czech Republic
2007 UEFA European Under-21 Football Championship squads – Czech Republic
2002 UEFA European Under-21 Football Championship squads – Czech Republic
2000 UEFA European Under-21 Football Championship squads – Czech Republic
1996 UEFA European Under-21 Football Championship squads – Czech Republic

Leading AppearancesNote: Those players in bold are still eligible to play for the team at the moment. 
Statistics up to and including Czech Republic vs Germany, 18 November 2014.

Leading GoalscorersNote: Club(s) represents the permanent clubs during the player's time in the Under-21s. Those players in bold' are still eligible to play for the team at the moment.Statistics up to and including Czech Republic vs Andorra, 5 June 2012.''

See also
Czech Republic national football team
Czech Republic national under-19 football team
Czech Republic national under-18 football team
Czech Republic national under-17 football team

Notes

References

External links

 UEFA Under-21 website Contains full results archive
 Czech Republic Under-21s at uefa.com
 Official ČMFS Czech Republic Under-21 website Contains listings and statistics of current and past Czech Republic U-21 players. 
 The Rec.Sport.Soccer Statistics Foundation Contains full record of U-21 Championships.

under-21
European national under-21 association football teams
Youth football in the Czech Republic